Kavinda Jayawardane is a Sri Lankan medical graduate and politician. He is Member of Parliament from Gampaha district having been elected in 2015 with a vote of 81,383. He was a provincial councillor in the Western Provincial Council.

He is the son of Dr. Jayalath Jayawardane former Cabinet Minister, he was educated at Royal College Colombo and studied medicine at Sri Ramachandra University, Madras.

References

Samagi Jana Balawegaya politicians
Members of the 15th Parliament of Sri Lanka
Members of the 16th Parliament of Sri Lanka
Members of the Western Provincial Council
Living people
Sinhalese physicians
Alumni of Royal College, Colombo
Year of birth missing (living people)